Virius Lupus ( – after 205) (possibly Lucius Virius Lupus) was a Roman soldier and politician of the late 2nd and early 3rd century.

Biography
Virius Lupus was the first member of the gens Virii to attain high office in the Roman Empire. His early career is unknown, but prior to 196, he would have been appointed as consul suffectus. He is first attested as serving as Legatus Augusti pro praetore at Germania Inferior, and supported Septimius Severus during the civil war that followed the murder of Pertinax. In 196 his troops were defeated by Decimus Clodius Albinus as the fight for the throne intensified.

After Severus' victory in the civil wars, Virius was appointed Governor of Britannia in 197. Severus sent him to Britain immediately to recover the province from the rebellions that had swept it following Clodius Albinus' removal of most of the garrison to press his claim for the throne the previous year.

In the north he was obliged to buy peace from the Maeatae. Fearful that they would ally with the Caledonian Confederacy and unable to secure troop reinforcements from Severus, Lupus had no choice but to pay the rebels in return for their withdrawal and the return of a few prisoners. Lupus slowly restored the forts in the Pennines to Roman control although Hadrian's Wall was not rebuilt until .

His governorship was assisted by the arrival of Sextus Varius Marcellus as provincial procurator and in who can be seen the germ of the later division of Britain into two provinces. He served as governor until 201 or 202.

It is assumed that Virius was the father of Lucius Virius Agricola, consul ordinarius in 230, and of Lucius Virius Lupus Iulianus, consul ordinarius in 232. He may have been related to Quintus Virius Egnatius Sulpicius Priscus, who appears to have been a suffect consul either during the reign of Septimius Severus or Caracalla

See also
 List of Roman governors of Britain

References

Sources

160 births
3rd-century deaths
Year of birth uncertain
Year of death unknown
Roman governors of Britain
2nd-century Romans
3rd-century Romans
Roman governors of Germania Inferior
Suffect consuls of Imperial Rome
Virii